Members of the Bellini family of artists in Renaissance Venice, most notably Giovanni Bellini, executed a number of paintings of the Madonna and Child, including the following:

Jacopo Bellini
Madonna and Child (Jacopo Bellini)
Tadini Madonna

Giovanni Bellini
Contarini Madonna
Lehman Madonna
Madonna and Child (Bellini, Detroit)
Madonna and Child (Bellini, New York, 1485–1490)
Madonna and Child (Bellini, Milan, 1460–1465)
Madonna and Child (Bellini, Milan, 1510)
Madonna and Child (Bellini, Pavia)
Madonna and Child (Bellini, Rome)
Madonna and Child (Bellini, Venice, 1475)
Madonna and Child (Bellini, Verona)